The modern Hebrew calendar has been designed to ensure that certain holy days and festivals do not fall on certain days of the week. As a result, there are only four possible patterns of days on which festivals can fall. (Note that Jewish days start at sunset of the preceding day indicated in this article.)

Reasons
The modern Hebrew calendar has been arranged so that Yom Kippur does not fall on a Friday or Sunday, and Hoshana Rabbah does not fall on Shabbat. These rules have been instituted because Shabbat restrictions also apply to Yom Kippur, and if Yom Kippur were to fall on Friday, it would not be possible to make necessary preparations for Shabbat, including candle lighting, because the preceding day is Yom Kippur. Similarly, if Yom Kippur fell on a Sunday, it would not be possible to make the necessary preparations for Yom Kippur, including candle lighting, because the preceding day is Shabbat. Also, the laws of Shabbat override those of Hoshana Rabbah, so that if Hoshana Rabbah were to fall on Shabbat certain rituals that are a part of Hoshana Rabbah services (such as carrying willows, which is work) could not be performed in that year.

As a consequence, in the case of Yom Kippur, which falls on 10 Tishrei and cannot fall on a Friday or Sunday, the days in Cheshvan and/or Kislev are adjusted so that Rosh Hashanah, which falls on 1 Tishrei, does not fall on a Wednesday or Friday. And, in the case of Hoshana Rabbah, which falls on 21 Tishrei and cannot fall on a Saturday, Rosh Hashanah cannot be on a Sunday. This leaves only four days on which Rosh Hashanah is allowed to fall: Monday, Tuesday, Thursday and Saturday, which are also referred as the "four gates".

The four gates
Since three arrangements cannot occur within the fixed calendar, most holidays can each occur on one of four possible days.

All the holy days and festivals fall in the months of Nisan through Tishrei, months one to seven. These months always have the same number of days, alternating 30 and 29. The next two months are Cheshvan and Kislev, months eight and nine. Both or either of these months can have either 29 or 30 days, allowing for adjustments to be made and the schedule in the coming year to be manipulated. (On a regular year, Cheshvan has 29 days and Kislev has 30 days). The months of Tevet and Shevat, months ten and eleven, have 29 and 30 days respectively. Finally, in a regular year the month of Adar has 29 days, while in a leap year Adar I of 30 days is added before the regular Adar, which becomes Adar II of 29 days. The result is that the period from 1 Tevet to 29 Cheshvan is fixed, except that in a leap year Adar I of 30 days is added; and all adjustments are made using 29/30 Cheshvan and/or 29/30 Kislev.

The period from 1 Adar (or Adar II, in leap years) to 29 Cheshvan contains all of the festivals specified in the Bible - Purim (14 Adar), Pesach (15 Nisan), Shavuot (6 Sivan), Rosh Hashanah (1 Tishrei), Yom Kippur (10 Tishrei), Sukkot (15 Tishrei), and Shemini Atzeret (22 Tishrei). This period is fixed, during which no adjustments are made. The result is that all dates from 1 Nisan through 29 (or 30) Cheshvan can each fall on one of four days of the week. Dates during Kislev can fall on any of six days of the week; during Tevet and Shevat, five days; and dates during Adar (or Adar I and II, in leap years) can each fall on one of four days of the week.

*Postponed to not fall on Shabbat

With each gate, some unusual effects occur.

Gate 1 (31.9%)
Since Purim falls on Sunday, the 13th of Adar, known as the Fast of Esther, falls on Saturday. Usually, fasts other than Yom Kippur are postponed to the following Sunday. But as this Sunday is Purim, and fasts are usually not observed on Friday, the fast is pushed back to the prior Thursday (the 11th of Adar).
No Yom Tov during the year (starting with Nisan) falls on Sunday, therefore havdalah during the Yom Tov kiddush is never recited during the course of the year.
Yom HaZikaron is postponed from Sunday to Monday, and Yom Ha'atzmaut is postponed from Monday to Tuesday, so that preparations cannot interfere with Shabbat.
During Tishrei, three holidays start on Thursday. In the Diaspora, the eruv tavshilin is prepared thrice. (In Israel, it is only made on Erev Rosh Hashanah.)
In Israel, this is the only occasion with a "three-day holiday" (the two days of Rosh Hashanah followed by the Sabbath).
The Fast of Gedaliah falls on Saturday. Since fasts other than Yom Kippur are not observed on Saturday, this is observed on the following Sunday. This leaves an interval of just five days between fasts, the shortest ever on the Jewish Calendar.
Yom Kippur occurs on Saturday. This is the only occurrence in which a fast is ever observed on Saturday. Ashkenazim do not recite Avinu Malkeinu except during Ne'ila.
If the previous gate was also 1, this is a leap year; and, Nitzavim-Vayelech are the only doubled-up parshiot during the year (Tishrei-Elul).
If this is a leap year and the previous gate was 2, Matot-Masei are also doubled up.
If the previous gate was 3, this is not a leap year.
If both Cheshvan and Kislev have 30 days, then the 10th of Tevet will occur on Friday, the only public fast that can possibly be observed on a Friday. The fast is not broken until about an hour after the Sabbath begins.
If both Cheshvan and Kislev have 30 days, then Purim Katan, the holiday that only occurs in leap years, will occur on Friday.

Gate 2 (28.6%)
The eruv tavshilin is prepared prior to Passover (diaspora only) and Shavuot.
Yom HaZikaron and Yom Ha'atzmaut are actually observed on 4 Iyar and 5 Iyar respectively.
In the diaspora, the second day of Shavuot falls on Saturday, the only time Shavuot ever falls on Saturday. (In Israel, Shavuot never occurs on Saturday.)
To compensate for this, Chukat-Balak are doubled up in the diaspora. (In Israel, these two parshiot are always read separately.)
Rosh Hashanah, Sukkot, and Shemini Atzeret begin on Saturday. On Rosh Hashanah, since blowing the Shofar is prohibited on the Sabbath, the shofar is blown only on the second day. Tashlich is also postponed to the second day. On Sukkot, the Four Species, which are not taken on the Sabbath, are unused on the first day.
In Israel, Simchat Torah, as it always coincides with Shemini Atzeret in Israel, falls on Saturday, the only time Simchat Torah ever falls on Saturday. (In the diaspora, Simchat Torah never occurs on Saturday.)
If the previous gate was also 2, this is a leap year.
If the previous gate was 4, this is not a leap year.
If both Cheshvan and Kislev have 29 days, then Hanukkah will begin on Friday. Only the Sabbath of Vayeshev will fall during Hanukkah, and the Sabbath of Miketz will not be during Hanukkah; this is the only case in which this will occur (and where Miketz's proper haftarah will thus be read).
If both Cheshvan and Kislev have 30 days, then both Sabbaths of Vayeshev and Miketz will fall during Hanukkah, as the holiday is eight days long.
The haftarah for the second Sabbath of Hanukkah is also the haftarah of Vayakhel which is also seldom read (it is only read in leap years when the preceding gate was 1).
If both Cheshvan and Kislev have 29 days, then the 10th of Tevet will occur on Friday, the only public fast that can possibly be observed on a Friday. The fast is not broken until about an hour after the Sabbath begins.
If both Cheshvan and Kislev have 30 days, then Rosh Chodesh Shevat and Tu Bishvat will occur on Saturday. This means that on Rosh Chodesh Shevat, two Torah scrolls are used for the Sabbath morning Torah reading: one for Va'eira and one for Rosh Chodesh.
If both Cheshvan and Kislev have 29 days, then Purim Katan, the holiday that only occurs in leap years, will occur on Friday.

Gate 3 (28.0%)
Rosh Chodesh Nisan occurs on Saturday. Three Torah scrolls are used for the Sabbath morning Torah reading: one for Vayikra (Tazria in leap years), another for Rosh Chodesh, and a third for Parshat Hachodesh.
The eruv tavshilin is prepared prior to the final day(s) of Passover.
In the diaspora, the final day of Passover is Saturday. In Israel, this day is not considered a part of Passover. Nevertheless, chametz cannot be consumed because it cannot be purchased on the Sabbath or Yom Tov for this consumption.
To compensate for this, either Behar and Bechukotai (in non-leap years) or Matot and Masei (in leap years) are read separately in Israel. (In the diaspora, Behar-Bechukotai are doubled up as with all other non-leap years. Matot and Masei are read separately only in leap years when the preceding gate was 1.)
Yom HaZikaron is pushed back from Thursday to Wednesday, and Yom Ha'atzmaut is pushed back from Friday to Thursday, so that the celebrations of Independence day do not continue into Shabbat.
The 17th of Tammuz and Tisha B'Av fall on Saturday. Since fasts other than Yom Kippur are not observed on Saturday, these are both observed on the following Sunday.
If the previous gate was 3 or 4, this is a leap year.
In this case, no parshiot are doubled-up in Israel during the year (Tishrei-Elul). This is also the only case in which Tzav's proper haftarah is read in Jerusalem (outside Jerusalem, it is also read when Gate 4 is a leap year).
If the previous gate was 1, this is not a leap year.
If both Cheshvan and Kislev have 29 days, then Hanukkah will begin on Sunday. This is the only occurrence in which the eve of Hanukkah begins on the Sabbath.
If both Cheshvan and Kislev have 30 days, then the 30th of Kislev (which is also the first day of Rosh Chodesh Tevet) will fall on Saturday. Since this is also during Hanukkah, three Torah scrolls are used for the Sabbath morning Torah reading: one for Miketz, another for Rosh Chodesh, and a third for Hanukkah.
If both Cheshvan and Kislev have 29 days, then Rosh Chodesh Shevat and Tu Bishvat will occur on Saturday. This means that on Rosh Chodesh Shevat, two Torah scrolls are used for the Sabbath morning Torah reading: one for Va'eira and one for Rosh Chodesh.

Gate 4 (11.5%)

Rosh Chodesh Adar (or Adar II) occurs on Saturday. Three Torah scrolls are used for the Sabbath morning Torah reading: one for Mishpatim or Terumah (Pekudei in leap years), another for the Rosh Chodesh reading, and a third for Parshat Shekalim.
Purim falls on Friday, and the Purim seudah is held earlier in the day. In Jerusalem, where Purim always occurs a day later, the observances are spread out over Friday, Saturday, and Sunday (a "three-day Purim").
If this is a non-leap year and the previous gate was 1, Vayakhel and Pekudei are not doubled up; this is the only non-leap year in which this occurs.
The Fast of the Firstborn is held on the Thursday before Passover (the 12th of Nisan).
Bedikat Chametz occurs on the night of the 13th of Nisan (Thursday night). Chametz is burned on the following Friday morning, but may be consumed throughout this day and up until Saturday morning, at which time any remaining chametz is flushed.
During Saturday morning on the eve of Passover, two meals are customarily consumed early in the morning in order to fulfill the mitzvah of Seudah Shlishit before the time in which chametz can no longer be consumed (4th Halachic hour).
Yom HaZikaron is pushed back two days from Friday to Wednesday, and Yom Ha'atzmaut is pushed back two days from Saturday to Thursday, so that one does not mourn on the eve of Shabbat and so that the celebrations of Independence day do not continue into Shabbat.
The 17th of Tammuz and Tisha B'Av are actually observed on Sunday, and there is no "week in which Tisha B'Av occurs" as a level of mourning prior to the start of Tisha B'Av.
The eruv tavshilin is never prepared at any time during this year (Nisan-Tishrei).
If the previous gate was 2, this is not a leap year.
If this is a leap year, there are no doubled-up parshiot during the year (Tishrei-Elul).
The first day of Rosh Chodesh Tevet falls on Saturday. Three Torah scrolls are used for the Sabbath morning Torah reading: one for Miketz, another for Rosh Chodesh, and a third for Hanukkah.

Next occurrence of each gate
Update when Purim comes around during the year with the next occurrence of either gate.
Gate 1 (Thursday Rosh Hashanah): 2024
Gate 2 (Saturday Rosh Hashanah): 2026
Gate 3 (Monday Rosh Hashanah): 2029
Gate 4 (Tuesday Rosh Hashanah): 2025

Sources
Shulchan Aruch, Orach Chaim 428:1
The Complete Artscroll Siddur

References

External links
Exact Hebrew Calendar Full Cycle Weekday Frequencies

Hebrew calendar